Holly Grove is a city in Monroe County, Arkansas, United States. As of the 2020 census, the city population was 460, down from 602 in 2010.

Geography
Holly Grove is located south of the center of Monroe County at  (34.597556, -91.200462).

Demographics

2020 census

As of the 2020 United States Census, there were 460 people, 266 households, and 170 families residing in the city.

2000 census
As of the census of 2000, there were 722 people, 301 households, and 176 families residing in the city. The racial makeup of the city was 26.87% White, 72.58% Black or African American, 0.14% Asian, and 0.42% from two or more races.  0.14% of the population were Hispanic or Latino of any race.

There were 301 households, out of which 26.9% had children under the age of 18 living with them, 24.9% were married couples living together, 28.2% had a female householder with no husband present, and 41.2% were non-families. 37.9% of all households were made up of individuals, and 24.9% had someone living alone who was 65 years of age or older.  The average household size was 2.40 and the average family size was 3.17.

In the city, the population was spread out, with 29.4% under the age of 18, 5.7% from 18 to 24, 23.1% from 25 to 44, 19.8% from 45 to 64, and 22.0% who were 65 years of age or older.  The median age was 39 years. For every 100 females, there were 77.0 males.  For every 100 females age 18 and over, there were 70.0 males.

The median income for a household in the city was $15,294, and the median income for a family was $17,232. Males had a median income of $24,444 versus $18,438 for females. The per capita income for the city was $10,047.  About 37.7% of families and 42.6% of the population were below the poverty line, including 61.3% of those under age 18 and 31.2% of those age 65 or over.

Education
Holly Grove is within the Clarendon School District. On July 1, 2004, the Holly Grove School District was merged into the Clarendon School District.

Notable people
 
 
Myrtle Smith Livingston (1902–1974), American educator and playwright

References

Cities in Arkansas
Cities in Monroe County, Arkansas